Doru may refer to:

 Doru (name)
 Doru (genus), a genus of earwigs
 Doru Shahabad, a town in Anantnag District, Jammu and Kashmir, India
 Dory (spear) or doru, the primary armament of Ancient Greek hoplites